Zeph is a given name. Notable people with the name include:

 Zeph E. Daniel, American screenwriter
 Zeph Ellis (born 1988), English rapper
 Zeph Hutchinson (1888–1959), British trade unionist
 Zeph Gladstone (1937–2002), British television actress
 Zeph Lee (born 1963), American football player

See also
 Mega Zeph, roller coaster in New Orleans, Louisiana
 Zephaniah (disambiguation)